Årstad (or historically spelled Aarstad) may refer to:

People
Stian Aarstad, a Norwegian pianist and keyboard player with the black metal band Dimmu Borgir
Søren Tobias Årstad, a Norwegian jurist and politician for the Liberal Party

Places
Årstad, Bergen, borough of Bergen, Norway
Årstad (municipality), a former municipality in Hordaland, Norway
Årstad Church, a church in the city of Bergen, Norway
Årstad, Falkenberg, locality in Falkenberg Municipality, Sweden
Årstad Hundred, hundred of Halland in Sweden

Other uses
The Årstad Stone, a stone featuring runic inscriptions found in Årstad, Rogaland, Norway
Årstad Idrettslag, a sports team/club in Bergen, Norway